Christophe Lim Wen Ying (born October 17, 1981) is a Mauritian former swimmer, who specialized in sprint freestyle events. Lim competed for Mauritius in the men's 100 m freestyle at the 2000 Summer Olympics in Sydney. He received a Universality place from FINA, in an entry time of 54.14. He challenged six other swimmers in heat two, including 15-year-olds Ragi Edde of Lebanon and Dawood Youssef of Bahrain. He raced to a third-place finish in 54.33, just 0.19 seconds below his entry standard and 0.78 behind leader Gregory Arkhurst of Côte d'Ivoire. Lim failed to advance into the semifinals, as he placed sixty-sixth overall in the prelims.
He also has 3 children, 1 who is a very fast swimmer and dominates Western Australian Swimming.

References

External links
 

1981 births
Living people
Mauritian male freestyle swimmers
Olympic swimmers of Mauritius
Swimmers at the 2000 Summer Olympics
Commonwealth Games competitors for Mauritius
Swimmers at the 1998 Commonwealth Games
Mauritian people of Chinese descent